This is a list of Greek artists from the antiquity to today.
Artists have been categorised according to their main artistic profession and according to the major historical period they lived in: the Ancient  (until the foundation of the Byzantine Empire), the Byzantine (until the fall of Constantinople in 1453), Cretan Renaissance 1453-1660, Heptanese School 1660-1830 and the Modern period (1830-today). Artists working after World War II are considered Contemporary.

Ancient Greece

Poets

Painters 

Agatharchus
Antiphilus
Apelles
Apollodorus (painter)
Aristides of Thebes
Cimon of Cleonae
Echion (painter)
Euphranor
Eupompus
Melanthius
Panaenus
Parrhasius
Pausias
Polyeidos (poet)
Polygnotus
Protogenes
Theon of Samos
Zeuxis

Vase painters

Potters 

Andokides
Brygos
Ergoteles
Ergotimos
Euphronios
Euthymides
Exekias
Exekias
Hermogenes
Kachrylion
Nearchos
Nikosthenes
Phintias
Phrynos
Sokles

Architects 

Apollodorus of Damascus
Callimachus (sculptor)
Chersiphron
Dinocratis 
Eupalinus
Iktinos
Kallikrates
Metagenes
Mnesikles
Aeulius Nicon
Philon
Pythis
Satyros
Sostratus of Cnidus

Novelists 

Achilles Tatius
Antonius Diogenes
Chariton
Heliodorus of Emesa
Iamblichus (novelist)
Longus
Lucian
Xenophon of Ephesus

Actors 

Metrobius
Thespis

Dramatists and playwrights 

Achaeus of Eretria
Achaeus of Syracuse
Aeschylus
Agathon
Alexander Aetolus
Alexis
Anaxandrides
Antiphanes
Aphareus (writer)
Apollodorus of Carystus
Aristarchus of Tegea
Aristophanes
Carcinus (writer)
Chaeremon
Choerilus (tragic poet)
Cleophon (poet)
Cratinus
Diphilus
Epicharmus of Kos
Eupolis
Euripides
Hegemon of Thasos
Herodas
Ion of Chios
Iophon
Menander
Neophron
Nicochares
Pherecrates
Philemon (poet)
Phrynichus (comic poet)
Phrynichus (tragic poet)
Plato (comic poet)
Pratinas
Rhinthon
Sophocles
Sositheus
Strattis
Theodectes
Xenocles

Byzantine Greece

Poets 

Christopher of Mytilene
Michael Glycas
John Mauropous
Vitsentzos Kornaros
Michael Tarchaniota Marullus
Paul the Silentiary
Manuel Philes
George Pisida
Michael Psellos
John Tzetzes

Painters 

Theodore Apsevdis
Michael Astrapas and Eutychios
Theophanes the Greek
Manuel Panselinos
Ioannis Pagomenos
Eulalios

Architects 

Anthemius of Tralles
Isidore of Miletus

Writers 

Nicephorus Blemmydes
Nicholas Cabasilas
Cassianus Bassus
Demetrius Chalcondylas
Michael Choniates
Coluthus
Constantine Manasses
Constantine VII
Cosmas Indicopleustes
Eustathius of Thessalonica
Patriarch Gregory II of Constantinople
Hesychius of Miletus
Kekaumenos
Leontios of Neapolis
Leontius (writer)
Joannes Laurentius Lydus
Mazaris
Patriarch Photios I of Constantinople
Leontius Pilatus
Rhetorius
Simeon Seth
Theodore Prodromus
Theodorus Hyrtacenus
Anna Comnena
Constantine VII Porphyrogenitus
Isaac of Nineveh
John of Damascus
Michael Psellos
Procopius
Zozimus

Post Byzantine Greece

Theater

Georgios Chortatzis
Vitsentzos Kornaros

Music

Francisco Leontaritis
Michele Stratico
Konstantinos Agathophron Nikolopoulos
Petros Peloponnesios

Painting

Italian and Spanish Renaissance Painters

Marco Basaiti
El Greco
Ioannis Permeniates
Victor
Belisario Corenzio
Antonio Vassilacchi
Jorge Manuel Theotocópuli

Cretan Renaissance Painters

Angelos Akotantos
Antonios Papadopoulos
Andreas Pavias
Angelos Pitzamanos
Andreas Ritzos
Nikolaos Tzafouris
Michael Damaskinos
Emmanuel Lambardos
Emmanuel Tzanfournaris
Fragkos Katelanos
Ioannis Apakas
Georgios Klontzas
Markos Bathas
Thomas Bathas
Onufri
Theophanes the Cretan
Elias Moskos
Ioannis Moskos
Leos Moskos
Franghias Kavertzas
Emmanuel Tzanes
Konstantinos Tzanes
Victor (iconographer)
Dionysius of Fourna

Heptanese School Painters

Stephanos Tzangarolas
Nikolaos Kallergis
Spyridon Sperantzas
Spiridione Roma
Theodore Poulakis
Nikolaos Doxaras
Nikolaos Kantounis
Nikolaos Koutouzis
Gerasimos Pitsamanos
Spyridon Ventouras
Konstantin Kapıdağlı

Neo-Hellenikos Diafotismos in Painting

Panagiotis Doxaras
Christodoulos Kalergis
Eustație Altini
Ioannis Kornaros

Modern Greece

Painters 

Constantine Andreou
Christodoulos Aronis
Giorgio de Chirico
Alexandros Christofis
Tasos Chonias
Hermon di Giovanno
Electros 
Nikos Engonopoulos
Costas Evangelatos
Demetrios Farmakopoulos
Alekos Fassianos
Demetrios Galanis
Katerina Grolliou
Nicholaos Gysis
Nikos Hadjikyriakos-Ghikas
Theophilos Hatzimihail
Georgios Jakobides
Christos Kapralos
Photios Kontoglou
Kourouniotis
Marios Loizides
Nikiphoros Lytras
Yiannis Moralis
Theocharis Mores
Dimitris Mytaras
Nicos Nicolaides
Nikos Nikolaou
Périclès Pantazis
George Papassavas
Mina Papatheodorou-Valyraki
Stass Paraskos
Konstantinos Parthenis
Yiannis Poulakas
Yiannis Psychopedis
Penelope Schizodimou
Yiannis Spyropoulos
Yannis Stavrou 
Nikos Stratakis
Panayiotis Tetsis
Epameinondas Thomopoulos
Yannis Tsarouchis
Alexandros Tzannis 
Antonio Vassilacchi
Spyros Vassiliou
Lydia Venieri
Konstantinos Volanakis
Constantin Xenakis
Nikolaos Xydias Typaldos
Odysseus Yakoumakis

Sculptors 

Joannis Avramidis
Constantine Andreou
Chryssa
Kostas Dikefalos
Aggelika Korovessi
Jannis Kounellis
Memos Makris
Thodoros Papadimitriou
Thodoros Papayiannis
Nikolaos Pavlopoulos
Pavlos Prosalentis
Kyriakos Rokos
Takis
Vassilis Vassili
Electros (also known as Babis Vekris)
Lydia Venieri
Constantin Xenakis
Iannis Xenakis

Film directors 

Kostas Andritsos
Theo Angelopoulos
Michael Cacoyannis
George Pan Cosmatos
Costa Gavras
Iakovos Kambanelis
Giorgos Konstadinou
Nikos Koundouros
Manakis brothers
Nico Mastorakis
Laura Neri
Dimitris Papamichael
Nikos Papatakis
Pavlos Tassios
Vassilis Photopoulos
Yannis Smaragdis
George Tzavellas
Agnès Varda
Dimitris Voyatzis

Poets 

Aris Alexandrou
Manolis Anagnostakis
Olga Broumas
Demetrios Capetanakis
Constantine P. Cavafy
Athanasios Christopoulos
Nikos Dimou
Odysseas Elytis
Andreas Embirikos
Nikos Engonopoulos
Costas Evangelatos
Rigas Feraios
Nikos Gatsos
Demetris Th. Gotsis
Sotiris Kakisis
Ektor Kaknavatos
Andreas Kalvos
Iakovos Kambanelis
Nikos Karouzos
Kostas Karyotakis
Nikos Kavvadias
Nikos Kazantzakis
Antigone Kefala
Napoleon Lapathiotis
Dimitris Lyacos
Jean Moréas
Kostis Palamas
Alexandros Panagoulis
Lefteris Papadopoulos
George Pavlopoulos
Maria Polydouri
Alexandros Rhizos Rhankaves
Yiannis Ritsos
Miltos Sachtouris
Giorgos Seferis
Angelos Sikelianos
Takis Sinopoulos
Giannis Skarimpas
Dionysios Solomos
Alexandros Soutsos
Alexis Stamatis
Theodore Stephanides
Nanos Valaoritis
Kostas Varnalis
Vassilis Vassilikos
Haris Vlavianos
Yannis Yfantis

Novelists 

Andreas Karkavitsas
Georgios Balanos
Penelope Delta
Apostolos Doxiadis
Vicky Hadjivassiliou
Andreas Kalvos
Christos Kapralos
Nikos Kazantzakis
Photios Kontoglou
Adamantios Korais
Ioannis Kottounios
Yannis Makriyannis
Menis Koumantareas
Alexandros Papadiamantis
Zacharias Papantoniou
Pythagoras Papastamatiou
Ioannis Psycharis
Giannis Skarimpas
Soti Triantafyllou
Vassilis Vassilikos
Demetrius Vikelas
Alki Zei

Dramatists and playwrights 

Angelos Terzakis
Crates (comic poet)
Apostolos Doxiadis
Nikos Kazantzakis
Dimitris Lyacos
M. Karagatsis
Nicos Nicolaides
Dimitris Psathas
Alexandros Rhizos Rhankaves
Giannis Skarimpas

Actors

Singers

Musicians

Ancient period

Alypius
Terpander

Modern period

Rita Abatzi
Maurice Abravanel
Art Alexakis
Louis Demetrius Alvanis
Costas Andreou
Theodore Antoniou
Grigoris Asikis
Nikolas Asimos
Gina Bachauer
Arion
Yiorgos Batis
Grigoris Bithikotsis
Miltiades Caridis
Pavlos Carrer
Petros Christo
Nikos Christodoulou
Jani Christou
Christos Dantis
Dionysios Demetis
Odysseas Dimitriadis
Marina Diamandis
Dimitris Dragatakis
Antiochos Evangelatos
Sarah P.
Kostas Exarhakis
Yorgos Foudoulis
Alexander Frey
Gus G.
Katy Garbi
Michalis Genitsaris
Christos Govetas
Manos Hadjidakis
Alkinoos Ioannidis
Sotiris Kakisis
George Kallis
Manolis Kalomiris
Iakovos Kambanelis
Alex Kapranos
Eleni Karaindrou
Herbert von Karajan
Nikos Karvelas
Antonios Katinaris
Bob Katsionis
Leonidas Kavakos
Stelios Kazantzidis
Areti Ketime
Panayiotis Kokoras
Iakovos Kolanian
Stavros Koujioumtzis
Akis Katsoupakis
Rena Kyriakou
Andreas Lagios
Alexandre Lagoya
Tim Lambesis
Leo Leandros
Manos Loizos
Andreas Makris
Sokratis Malamas
Ilan Manouach
Nikolaos Mantzaros
Giannis Markopoulos
Kostas Martakis
Alex Martinez
Thanos Mikroutsikos
Dimitris Mitropoulos
Kostas Mountakis
Georges Moustaki
Orianthi Panagaris
Tzimis Panousis
Lefteris Papadimitriou
Lefteris Papadopoulos
Thanassis Papakonstantinou
Elena Paparizou
Apostolos Paraskevas
Stelios Perpiniadis
Phivos
Sadahzinia
Sakis Rouvas
Spyros Samaras
Dionysis Savvopoulos
Kyriakos Sfetsas
Dimitris Sgouros
Pavlos Sidiropoulos
Nikos Skalkottas
Kostas Skarvelis
Camille-Marie Stamaty
Giorgos Theofanous
Marios Tokas
Sakis Tolis
Michalis Travlos
Tatiana Troyanos
Iovan Tsaous
Vassilis Tsitsanis
Markos Vamvakaris
Despina Vandi
Vangelis
Marios Varvoglis
Anna Vissi
Haris Xanthoudakis
Stavros Xarhakos
Iannis Xenakis
Nikos Xilouris
Nikos Xydakis
Spyridon Xyndas
Mirka Yemendzakis
Yanni
Savvas Ysatis

Composers

Contemporary Artists

Visual Artists (mixed or new media, interdisciplinary, photography, film, performance, other) 

Loukia Alavanou
Andreas Angelidakis
Manolis Anastasakos
Aggelos Antonopoulos
Nikos Arvanitis
Bill Balaskas
Kostas Bassanos
Pantelis Chandris
Nikos Charalambidis
Dionisis Christofilogiannis
Anastasia Douka
Dora Economou
Eirene Efstathiou
Stelios Faitakis
Alexandros Georgiou
Marina Gioti
Maria Glyka
Guerrilla Optimists
Effie Halivopoulou
Zoe Hatziyannaki
Dionisis Kavallieratos
Giorgos Kazazis
Panos Kokkinias
Georgia Kotretsos
Marinos Koutsomichalis
Maria Loizidou
Andreas Lolis
Dimitrios Skalkotos
Panos Kokkinias
Miltos Manetas
Lena Mitsolidou 
Nina Papaconstantinou
Agelos Papadimitriou
Maria Papadimitriou
Nikos Papadimitriou
Ilias Papailiakis
Nina Pappa
Antonis Pittas
Poka-Yo
Afroditi Psarra
Madalina Psoma
Thalia Raftopoulou
Georgia Sagri
Kostis Stafylakis
Eva Stefani
Stefania Strouza
Penelope Schizodimou
Lina Theodorou
Panos Tsagaris
Giorgos Tserionis
Kostas Tsolis
Maria Varela
Alexandros Vasmoulakis
Kostis Velonis
Vaggelis Vlachos
Vassilis Vlastaras
Zafos Xagoraris
Myrto Xanthopoulou
Yorgos Zois

Art Historians

Art Curators 
Dimitios Spyrou
Evita Tsokanta
Elpida Karaba

Art Magazines | Journals | websites 
peri-technes
enterprise projects

Nonprofit organisations 
THE TELOS SOCIETY
ARCAthens
ARCH
Kaktos Project

References

Greek
Arts in Greece
Greek art
Artists